The 2013–14 season was Queens Park Rangers's 125th professional season.

Players
As of 19 February 2014

First team squad

Loaned out

Transfers

In

Out

Loans in

Loans out

Season statistics

League table

l

Results summary

Results by matchday

Fixtures & results

Pre-season

Championship

Championship play-offs

Semi-final

Final

FA Cup

League Cup

Player statistics

Appearances, goals and discipline

Goalscorers

Clean sheets

References

Notes

Queens Park Rangers F.C. seasons
Queens Park Rangers